Camptopelta is a subgenus of flies in the family Stratiomyidae.

Species
N. aldrichi (Williston, 1917)
N. nigrinus Fallén, 1817
N. wilfordhansoni (Woodley, 2001)

References

Stratiomyidae
Taxa named by Samuel Wendell Williston
Diptera of Europe
Diptera of North America
Diptera of South America
Insect subgenera